"Petite Sœur" is a song by French singer Lââm, originally released as a single on 15 August 2005. It was the lead single from her studio album Pour être libre, published six weeks later.

The single debuted at number five in France, eventually, eight weeks later, climbing to its peak position of number two.

Composition and recording 
The song was written by  Godebama and Laura Marciano and produced by FB Cool and SDO.

Track listings 
CD single (Heben 82876695762)
 "Petite sœur" (3:50)
 "Jamais loin de toi" (Version Acoustique) (2:42)
 "Tu es d'un chemin" (World Mix) (3:23)
 "Petite sœur" (Instru) (3:45)
Extras:
 "Petite sœur" (Video)

Charts

Weekly charts

Year-end charts

Certifications

Awards and nominations 
 2006 NRJ Music Awards — Nominated for the Francophone Song of the Year

References 

2005 songs
2005 singles
Lââm songs
Heben Music singles
Ultratop 50 Singles (Wallonia) number-one singles